The 2001 UCI Women's Road World Cup was the fourth edition of the UCI Women's Road World Cup. It was contested over nine rounds as the calendar saw a return of the Trophée International and the New Zealand World Cup rounds. The series was won for a second time by Anna Millward, who won the competition in 1999.

Races

Final classification

External links

2001 in women's road cycling
UCI Women's Road World Cup